Trevor Harris (born May 31, 1986) is an American professional Canadian football quarterback for the Saskatchewan Roughriders of the Canadian Football League (CFL). He was signed by the Jacksonville Jaguars as an undrafted free agent in 2010. Harris has also played in the Arena Football League and United Football League. He played college football at Edinboro University. As Edinboro's starting quarterback, he broke "every career passing record in the Pennsylvania State Athletic Conference" and was a two-time finalist for the Harlon Hill Trophy, awarded each year to the individual selected as the most valuable player in NCAA Division II.

Early years
Harris was an Ohio all-state selection in both football and basketball at Marion Pleasant High School. He was a three-year starter in football, throwing for 1,523 yards and 23 TD s as a senior, completing 90 of 149 passes with just 7 INTs. He was named the Offensive Back of the Year by the North Central Ohio Football Coaches Association, and was also a first team all-NCOFCA choice. He was also a first team All-Mid Ohio Athletic Conference choice and was named the District 11 Player of the Year. He was an All-Ohio selection as a junior, while also being named first team all-MOAC and All-NCOFCA. He completed his career throwing for 4,439 yards with 59 TDs and 19 INTs, adding 6 TDs rushing.

College career
Harris played collegiate football at Edinboro University of Pennsylvania, a member of NCAA Division II's Pennsylvania State Athletic Conference. Early in his sophomore year, he broke the school's single-game passing record, leading the Pittsburgh Post-Gazette to predict, accurately it turned out, that Harris would "rewrite the school's passing records."

In 2008, he became the third Edinboro player to be a finalist for the Harlon Hill Trophy, and was a finalist again in 2009. Harris was named to the 2009 Consensus Draft Services Preseason All-American Team.   He was the first player to repeat as PSAC West Offensive Player of the Year since Randy McKavish of Slippery Rock won the honor in 1997 and again in 1998. He was a three-time All-PSAC West selection and was the PSAC West Rookie of the Year as a freshman.

In his final game at Edinboro, an NCAA playoff game against West Liberty University, Harris set a Division II record with 630 passing yards in a playoff game. West Liberty won the game 84–63, as the two teams combined for 1,394 yards.

Harris finished his career with 11,899 yards passing, completing 66% of his passes and throwing for 100 touchdowns.

Professional career

Jacksonville Jaguars
On April 24, 2010, Harris signed with the Jacksonville Jaguars as an undrafted free agent following the 2010 NFL Draft. He was waived from the team following the preseason.

Arizona Rattlers
On November 12, 2010, Harris was signed by the AFL's Arizona Rattlers.

Hartford Colonials
On July 14, 2011, Harris signed with the United Football League's Hartford Colonials.

Buffalo Bills
On July 27, 2011, Trevor Harris agreed to terms with the Buffalo Bills. However, due to labour issues in the NFL that year, the team rescinded the contract 36 hours after signing him.

Orlando Predators
On October 31, 2011, Harris signed with the Orlando Predators of the Arena Football League.

Toronto Argonauts
On March 29, 2012, Harris signed with the Toronto Argonauts of the Canadian Football League. In the Argonauts second, and final, pre-season game of the 2012 CFL season, Harris threw 13 completions in 15 attempts, for 160 yards and two touchdowns. His outstanding performance earned him a spot on the roster. Harris played in two games in the 2012 season completing eight of 19 throws for 80 yards. Harris continued his strong pre-season play in the first preseason game of the 2013 season; completing eight of 11 passing attempts for 115 yards. During the 2014 CFL season Harris started in one game, and played in another five games. For the entire season he attempted 60 passes, completing 42 of them (70% completion percentage), for 449 passing yards with two touchdowns and one interception.

During the 2015 preseason, the Argos announced that Ricky Ray (incumbent starting QB) would miss the first six games of the regular season as he recovered from a torn rotator cuff injury sustained in the 2014 season.; Thus making Harris the Argos starting quarterback for Week 1. Trevor Harris started the first 16 games of the CFL season for the Argos as Ricky Ray's injury rehab took longer than expected. During the season, he led the Argos to a record of 9–7 before Ray would start the final two games of the season and the Argos lone playoff game. During his first season as a starting CFL quarterback Harris played admirably. He completed 382 out of 538 pass attempts (71% completion) for 4354 yards with 33 touchdowns and 19 interceptions (both league highs for 2015).

Ottawa Redblacks

Within the first few hours of free-agency starting on February 9, 2016, the Ottawa Redblacks announced that Harris had signed with the team to a two-year contract. He began the season as the backup to Henry Burris who turned 41 years old when the season began. Harris made his Redblacks debut partway through the opening game of the season after Burris injured his finger while receiving the ball from a shotgun snap. Harris completed 17 of 19 passing attempts for 292 yards, with three touchdowns and zero interceptions leading the Redblacks to a dramatic overtime victory over the defending Grey Cup champion Edmonton Eskimos. Following the game, it was announced that Burris would be placed on the 1-game injured list, making Harris the starting quarterback for Week 2. Only a couple days later it was announced that Burris had been transferred to the six-game injured list. Harris was named as a player of the week three times in the month of July, and chosen as the second best player in the month behind teammate wide-receiver Chris Williams. Harris was injured during a July 22 (Week 5) game against the Saskatchewan Roughriders and replaced by back-up Brock Jensen for the rest of the game. The following week (Week 6), Henry Burris returned from his injury as starting quarterback, and Harris was considered week-to-week with knee and ankle injuries. Following their Week 9 loss to the Alouettes, Ottawa Head Coach Rick Campbell announced that Harris would return to the starting lineup for Week 10 against the BC Lions. In his absence the club had lost three of their four games. Harris started in the next six games for the Redblacks but was ultimately unable to meet expectations, only winning two games and losing four. He was subsequently benched again in favour of Henry Burris. Under Burris' leadership the Redblacks went on to win the 104th Grey Cup. Within a week of winning the Grey Cup Redblacks General Manager Marcel Desjardins stated that based on how the contracts are structured (for Burris and Harris) the team planned for Harris to be their starting quarterback for the 2017 season. Burris retired on January 24, 2017.

Harris started the first 12 games of the 2017 season for the Redblacks before leaving the team's Week 12 game against the Hamilton Tiger-Cats after suffering a shoulder injury. A couple days later it was announced by head coach Rick Campbell that Harris would be out at least a couple weeks with a bruised shoulder. Harris concluded the 2017 campaign having set new career highs in completions, attempts and passing yards, leading Ottawa to the playoffs for the third consecutive season. Not long after the season ended the Redblacks and Harris agreed to a one-year contract extension keeping him with the club through the 2018 CFL season. Harris was set to become a free-agent in February 2018 had both sides not been able to come to deal. Harris had his most productive season in 2018, setting new career highs in pass attempts, completions, and yards. In the Redblacks' East Final playoff game against the Tiger-Cats, Harris set a new CFL record for most passing touchdowns in a single playoff game with six. He completed 29 of 32 pass attempts for 367 yards, leading the Redblacks to their third Grey Cup appearance in four years. However, Harris and the Redblacks were bested in the 106th Grey Cup by the Calgary Stampeders.

Edmonton Eskimos/Elks 
On February 12, 2019, it was announced that Harris had signed with the Edmonton Eskimos. Harris started in the Eskimos' first 12 games of the season before being ruled out for the team's Week 15 match against the Tiger-Cats with an upper body injury. Subsequently, he was placed on the six-game injured reserve list on September 27, 2019. Harris was activated off of the six-game injured reserve list on October 21, 2019, with two games remaining in the season. He finished the season having played and started in 13 regular season games, but still managed to pass for over 4,000 yards for the fourth time in his career. He also tripled his career touchdowns by rushing for six touchdowns during the 2019 regular season, bringing his career total to nine. He led the Eskimos to the East Final as the crossover team, but lost to the Hamilton Tiger-Cats. During the following off-season, on January 31, 2020, Harris signed a contract extension with the Eskimos that would keep him in Edmonton through the 2022 season. Harris started the first four games of the season for the Elks before being placed on the six-game injured reserve list with a neck injury on September 16, 2021. On September 27, 2021, Harris was activated off the injured reserve list, however he was not included on the game-day roster for Week 9. Harris returned to his starting role for the Elks' Week 10 match against the Blue Bombers; however, Harris was replaced by rookie Taylor Cornelius in the fourth quarter as Harris proved to be ineffective. On October 12, 2021, Edmonton Elks head coach Jamie Elizondo announced that Cornelius would once again get the Week 11 start ahead of a healthy Trevor Harris who wasn't performing to expectations.

Montreal Alouettes 
On October 17, 2021, Harris was traded to the Montreal Alouettes in exchange for Antonio Simmons. Harris played in the final four regular season games to close out the season, starting the last three games. He also started the Alouettes' lone playoff game against the Tiger-Cats, which they lost 23-12, bringing Montreal's season to an end. On December 20, 2021, Harris was released by the Alouettes. According to TSN sports journalist and reporter Dave Naylor Harris' contract in the 2022 season would have been upwards of $500,000, with a considerable bonus due in the winter offseason. The Alouettes had previously agreed to a contract extension with starting quarterback Vernon Adams.

On February 9, 2022, it was announced that Harris had re-signed with the Alouettes. Harris began the 2022 season as the backup quarterback to Adams, however, after the offence only gained 21 yards in the first quarter of the team's second game, Harris was inserted into the game to lead the team. When Khari Jones was relieved of his duties in early-July, interim head coach Danny Maciocia continued with Harris as the starting quarterback. Harris started 15 games for the Alouettes in 2022, with an 8–7 record, and led the team to a second place finish in the East Division. After a win over the Hamilton Tiger-Cats in the East Semi-Final, he completed 25 passes out of 30 attempts for 362 yards and one touchdown in the 34–27 loss to the Toronto Argonauts in the East Final. In early February 2023, as a pending free agent, Harris was non-committal about returning to Montreal for the 2023 season.

Saskatchewan Roughriders 
On February 14, 2023, the first day of free agency, Harris signed a two-year contract with the Saskatchewan Roughriders.

Career statistics

References

External links

 Montreal Alouettes bio

1986 births
Living people
American football quarterbacks
American players of Canadian football
Arizona Rattlers players
Canadian football quarterbacks
Edinboro Fighting Scots football players
Jacksonville Jaguars players
Orlando Predators players
People from Marion County, Ohio
Players of American football from Ohio
Ottawa Redblacks players
Toronto Argonauts players
Edmonton Elks players